Miss Universe 1978, the 27th Miss Universe pageant, was held on 24 July 1978 at the Centro de Convenciones de Acapulco in Acapulco, Mexico. It was the first time in the pageant's history that the event was held in Mexico. Margaret Gardiner of South Africa was crowned by Janelle Commissiong of Trinidad and Tobago at the end of the event. This is the first time South Africa won the pageant.

Results

Placements

Final Competition 

Order Of Announcements

Top 12

Top 5

Judges
The following celebrities judged the final competition:
 Christiane Martel – Miss Universe 1953 from France
 Dewi Sukarno – Japanese socialite and former first lady of Indonesia
 David Merrick – Tony Award-winning American theatrical producer
 Line Renaud – French singer and actress
 Miloš Forman – Film director from Czechoslovakia
 Ursula Andress – Swiss actress and sex symbol of the 1960s
 Melba Moore – American singer
 Roberto Cavalli – Italian fashion designer
 Wilhelmina Cooper – Founder of Wilhelmina Models
 Anna Moffo – American opera singer
 Mario Moreno "Cantinflas" – Mexican comedian and stage and film actor

Contestants

  – Palepa Sio Tauliili
  – Delia Stella Maris Muñoz
  – Margarita Marieta Tromp
  – Beverly Frances Pinder
  – Doris Elizabeth Anwander
  – Dulcie Louise Millings
  – Judy Margot Miller
  – Françoise Hélène Julia Moens
  – Christina Margarita Ysaguirre
  – Madeline Francine Joell
  – Raquel Roca Kuikanaga
  – Corinne Rosseley Hernandez
  – Suzana Araújo dos Santos
  – Andrea Leslie Eng
  – Marianne Müller Prieto
  – Mary Shirley Sáenz Starnes
  – Maribel Fernández García
  – Solange Abigail de Castro
  – Anita Heske
  – Raquel Josefina Jacobo Jaar
  – Mabel Ceballos Sangster
  – Iris Ivette Mazorra Castro
  – Beverly Isherwood
  – Seija Kaarina Paakkola
  – Brigitte Konjovic
  – Eva Marie Gabrielle Gottschalk
  – Marieta Kountouraki
  – Mary Lois Sampson
  – Claudia María Iriarte
  – Karen Ingrid Gustafsson
  – Olimpia Velásquez Medina
  – Winnie Chan Man-Yuk
  – Anna Björk Edwards
   – Alamjeet Kaur Chauhan
  – Lorraine Bernadette Enriquez
  – Dorit Jellinek
  – Andreina Mazzoti
  – Hisako Manda
  – Jung-eun Shon
  – Reine Antoine Semaan
  – Joan Libuseng Khoali
  – Yasmin Yusoff
  – Pauline Lewise Farrugia
  – Alba Margarita Cervera Lavat
  – Majida Tazi
  – Christine Spooner
  – Jane Simmonds
  – Claudia Herrera Cortés
  – Julias Salas Concepción
  – Jeanette Aarum
  – Diana Leticia Conte Vergara
  – Angelyn Muta Tukana
  – Rosa María Duarte Melgarejo
  – Olga Roxana Zumarán Tapullima
  – Jennifer Mitschek Cortez
  – Ada Cecilia Flores Perkins †
  – Evelyn Pongerand
  – Angela Mary Kate McLeod
  – Annie Mei Ling Lee
  – Margaret Gardiner
  – Guillermina Ruiz Domenech
  – Dlirukshi Wimalasooriya
 – Gailene Collin
  – Garrance Harriette Rustwijk
  – Cécilia Rodhe
  – Sylvia von Arx
  Tahiti – Pascaline Tumia Teriireoo
  – Pornpit Sakornvijit
  – Sophia Titus
  – Billur Lutfiye Bingol
  – María del Carmen da Rosa
  – Judi Lois Andersen
  – Marisol Alfonzo Marcano
  – Barbara Henderson
  – Elizabeth Ann Jones

Notes

Debuts

Returns
Last competed in 1964:
 
Last competed in 1969:
 
Last competed in 1975:
 
Last competed in 1976:

Withdrawals

Awards
  - Miss Amity (Sophia Titus)
  - Miss Photogenic (Maribel Fernández)
  - Best National Costume (Alamjeet Kaur Chauhan)
  - Miss Press (Margarita Marieta Tromp)

General references

References

External links
 Miss Universe official website

1978
1978 in Mexico
1978 beauty pageants
Beauty pageants in Mexico
July 1978 events in Mexico